Georgi-Rene Maksimovski (born 22 July 1966) is the former and initial First Gentleman of Estonia, married to Estonian President Kersti Kaljulaid since 2011.

Born into a Seto family, he is the son of Nektari and Valve Maksimovski. He also has one sibling. From 1984–1991, he studied at Tallinn University of Technology. Beginning in 1993, Maksimovski worked at the State Infocommunication Foundation where he was employed for 16 years until 2009.

In 2004, Maksimovski began to date Kaljulaid and the couple had their first son in 2005, having their second just four years later. They were officially married in 2011. Outside the Presidential Palace, Maksimovski owns an apartment in Lasnamäe. Little is known about his daily life, which leads some in the Estonian media to speculate that he is part of the domestic intelligence service.

Honours

Foreign honours
 :
 Grand Decoration of Honour in Gold with Sash of the Decoration of Honour for Services to the Republic of Austria (26 May 2021)
 :
 Grand Cross of the Order of the White Rose of Finland (7 March 2017)
 :
 Knight Grand Cross of the Order of Merit of the Italian Republic (5 June 2018)
 :
 Commander Grand Cross of the Order of the Three Stars (10 April 2019)
 :
 Grand Cross of the Order of the Crown (12 June 2018)
 :
 Grand Cross of the Order of Merit (16 April 2019)

References

1966 births
Living people
Seto people
Spouses of presidents of Estonia
Tallinn University of Technology alumni